The 2005 Jaunpur train bombing occurred on 28 July 2005, when an explosion destroyed a carriage of Shramjeevi Express train near the town of Jaunpur in Uttar Pradesh.

The Shramjeevi Express train was travelling in the afternoon between Jaunpur and Delhi when, at 5.15pm, a sudden explosion tore through one of the carriages. The train's crew was able to halt the engine quickly, thus preventing the train derailing following the blast. As other passengers and locals aided those wounded by the blast, emergency services fought to extinguish the burning carriage.

Thirteen people were killed by the blast, or died later from their injuries. A further 50 people required medical treatment, including several who underwent amputations. The cause of the explosion was traced to the carriage's toilet, where a bomb using the explosive RDX had detonated. RDX is a military grade explosive which had been used in several terrorist attacks on Indian targets, including the Ayodhya train bombing in June 2000.

Eyewitnesses reported two young men who boarded the train at Jaunpur with a white suitcase. Shortly afterwards, both of them leaped from the moving train into fields and ran away without their suitcase. A few minutes later, the explosion shook the carriage.

According to officials, it is highly unlikely that this was an accidental explosion, and authorities are attributing it to Islamic extremists.

See also
 Uttar Pradesh train accidents

External links
Initial Russian News Report
Russian article on incident
Russian article on investigation
BBC News Report
India Express eyewitness account

21st-century mass murder in India
Attacks in India in 2005
Mass murder in 2005
Train bombings in Asia
Transport in Jaunpur, Uttar Pradesh
Improvised explosive device bombings in India
Terrorist incidents in India in 2005
Railway accidents and incidents in Uttar Pradesh
Jaunpur train bombing
Jaunpur, Uttar Pradesh
History of Uttar Pradesh (1947–present)
Terrorist incidents in Uttar Pradesh
July 2005 events in India